The Appearances of Keak da Sneak is a compilation album released by rapper, Keak da Sneak featuring songs from various previously released albums in which he had a guest appearance. It was released on October 23, 2001 for Moe Doe Records and was produced by Ant Banks, One Drop Scott and Tone Capone. Many guests appeared on the album, including Luniz, Mac Dre and his group, 3X Krazy. It sold 5,000 copies in its first week on shelves.

Track listing
"Mobb Shit"- 5:11 (Featuring Luniz)
"In tha Doe"- 4:19
"Rap Game"- 4:09 (Featuring B.A.)
"Ride Fo This"- 3:01
"Broke Off"- 4:57 (Featuring The Delinquents, 3X Krazy)
"Ring It"- 4:45 (Featuring E-40, Spice 1, Harm)
"Mac Dammit and Friends"- 3:33 (Featuring Mac Dre, PSD)
"No Remorse"- 4:09
"No Win Situation"- 4:04 (Featuring King T, Ant Banks)
"I'd Rather Smoke With U"- 4:10
"Comin for Me"- 4:39
"Raw Meat"- 2:56 (Featuring Brotha Lynch Hung)
"Welcome to Oakland"- 4:17
"Ain't Shit Changed"- 4:25
"Broke"- 4:15
"Shockn Niggaz"- 3:44 (Featuring Killa Tay)
"Life Ain't Bullshit"- 3:34

References

2001 albums
Keak da Sneak albums
Albums produced by Ant Banks